The Financial Regulatory Authority is a financial regulatory authority that regulates the financial service industry in Egypt. It is an Egyptian Government integrated agency that supervises all non-banking financial transactions and markets including capital markets, derivative markets, commodities, insurance, mortgage finance, financial leasing and factoring.

History
With the passing of Law no. 10, 2009, issued on February 25, 2009, the agency was established and became operationally effective on July 1, 2009. It replaced three major regulating authorities: the Capital Market Authority, the Insurance Supervisory Authority, and the Mortgage Finance Authority. This unification was intended to foster Egypt's financial sector.

Establishing the new authority is part of at a series of reforms aimed to strengthen the stability and security of the non-banking financial sector in Egypt and its interoperability with the banking sector. This move came against a backdrop of the global economic and financial crisis of 2007–2010 which highlighted the need for integrity and transparency in financial markets.

Ashraf El-Sharkawy headed the authority after the January 2011 uprising.

The agency was known as the Egyptian Financial Supervisory Authority (EFSA) in English until Nov 2017 when it was rebranded in English only as the Financial Regulatory Authority.

Responsibilities and structure
The Financial Regulatory Authority supervises all non-banking financial transactions and markets including importantly capital markets, derivative markets on financial assets and commodities, insurance contracts and services, mortgage finance, financial leasing, factoring, and securitization.

The agency is an ordinary member of the International Organization of Securities Commissions (IOSCO). Both Cairo and Alexandria Stock Exchanges (CASE), as well as Misr Company for Central Clearing, Depository & Registry (MCDR), have a membership of the IOSCO too, but they are affiliate members.

The headquarters is located in Smart Village.

See also
Securities commission
Economy of Egypt

References

Egypt
2009 establishments in Egypt
Government agencies established in 2009